Letizia Bertoni (born 5 March 1937 in Milan) is a former Italian hurdler.

She was twice in 5th place on 4x100 metres relay at the Olympic Games (1956 and 1960).

Biography
Letizia Bertoni participated at two editions of the Summer Olympics (1956 and 1960), she has 33 caps in national team from 1953 to 1965.

Achievements

National titles
Letizia Bertoni has won eight times the individual national championship.
7 wins on 80 metres hurdles (1958, 1959, 1960, 1961, 1962, 1963, 1964)
1 win on 200 metres (1962)

See also
 Italy national relay team

References

External links
 

1937 births
Italian female sprinters
Italian female hurdlers
Athletes (track and field) at the 1956 Summer Olympics
Athletes (track and field) at the 1960 Summer Olympics
Athletes from Milan
Olympic athletes of Italy
Living people
European Athletics Championships medalists
20th-century Italian women
21st-century Italian women